Śawt ሠ is a letter of the Ge'ez abugida, descended from Epigraphic South Arabian , in Ge'ez representing ś. It is reconstructed as descended from a Proto-Semitic voiceless lateral fricative  , like the Welsh pronunciation of the ll in llwyd. It survived only in South Semitic as an independent phoneme.

See also
Ḍäppa  ፀ
Proto-Semitic
Sat (letter)  ሰ
Shin (letter)

Ge'ez language